Charles H. Cleveland is a retired United States Army major general who served as the Director of Operations and Military Deputy of the National Geospatial-Intelligence Agency from January 2019 to July 2022. Previously, he served as the Vice Director for Intelligence of the Joint Staff from June 2017 to December 2018.

References

Living people
Place of birth missing (living people)
Recipients of the Defense Superior Service Medal
Recipients of the Legion of Merit
United States Army generals
United States Army personnel of the Gulf War
United States Army personnel of the Iraq War
United States Army personnel of the War in Afghanistan (2001–2021)
Year of birth missing (living people)